The  was a 10.1 km single-track line operated by Tobu Railway, which ran from Kumagaya to Menuma in Saitama Prefecture between 1943 and 1983.

History
Construction of the line was planned during the Pacific War to provide transportation for the military supply factories located in the area. It opened on 5 December 1943, although the shortage of materials during the war meant that the rails for the line had to be procured by singling the Tobu Nikko Line between Kassemba and Tobu Nikko Stations. The original plan to extend the line beyond Menuma over the Tone River to the freight terminal at Shin-Koizumi (on the now closed Sengokugashi Freight Line extending from the Tobu Koizumi Line at Nishi-Koizumi) was cancelled following the end of the war.

The line was not linked to any other Tobu lines, and remained unprofitable. It was finally closed on 31 May 1983.

Some of the former Kumagaya Line track remains in situ between Kumagaya and Kami-Kumagaya on the Chichibu Main Line, as does one of the concrete piers for the planned Tone River bridge, on the Gunma Prefecture side of the river.

Stations
Source: 

Notes:

Rolling stock

The line was initially operated using Class B2 (ex-JNR Class 5300) Beyer, Peacock & Company-built steam locomotives (numbers 27 and 28, ex-JNR 5312 and 5313) hauling former DeHa 1 electric cars converted to non-powered passenger coaches. A fleet of three new KiHa 2000 series diesel railcars built by Tokyu Car was introduced from February 1954. These were initially painted in Japanese National Railways-style blue and cream, but from June 1963, they were repainted into the Tobu livery of "royal beige" and "international orange". From February 1972, the three railcars were repainted into the Tobu livery of all-over "sage cream".

See also
 List of railway lines in Japan

References

Kumagaya Line
Rail transport in Saitama Prefecture
1067 mm gauge railways in Japan
Railway lines opened in 1943
Railway lines closed in 1983